The twenty-third season of Saturday Night Live, an American sketch comedy series, originally aired in the United States on NBC between September 27, 1997, and May9, 1998.

This season saw the deaths of two former cast members. Six weeks after he came back to host, Chris Farley became the fifth SNL cast member to die prematurely. Similar to his idol, John Belushi, Farley died of a speedball overdose at the age of 33. Two weeks after the season finale, long-time performer Phil Hartman was murdered by his wife who then committed suicide. Following their deaths, NBC aired two SNL specials as tributes to Farley and Hartman as they were both dedicated to their memories during this season.

Cast
Before the season, Mark McKinney left the show. Colin Quinn was promoted to repertory status. This season is the first season to not include any featured players or new cast members.

During the season, a controversy arose in which Weekend Update anchor Norm Macdonald was removed from the Update segment, Macdonald's final episode as Update anchor was on December 13, 1997. Quinn was then promoted to the job and anchored the segment in the next live episode, which aired January 10, 1998. Even though Macdonald still performed in sketches, he was not happy and eventually quit the show; his final appearance was on March 14, 1998.

This was also the final season for Jim Breuer as he left the show at season's end to move on to other acting opportunities.

It was also the only season to have an opening sequence that did not show any shots of New York City, instead featuring a 1950s-inspired design.

Cast roster
Repertory players
Jim Breuer
Will Ferrell
Ana Gasteyer
Darrell Hammond
Chris Kattan
Norm Macdonald (final episode: March 14, 1998)
Tim Meadows
Tracy Morgan
Cheri Oteri
Colin Quinn
Molly Shannon
bold denotes Weekend Update anchor

Writers

Tina Fey joins the writing staff in this season. Jim Downey leaves the show after Norm Macdonald was taken off Weekend Update (since Downey co-wrote Update with Macdonald).

Episodes

Specials

References

23
Saturday Night Live in the 1990s
1997 American television seasons
1998 American television seasons
Television shows directed by Beth McCarthy-Miller